Logan State Park is a public recreation area on the north shore of Middle Thompson Lake, off US Route 2 midway between Libby and Kalispell, Montana. The state park encompasses  within 3,000-acre Thompson Chain of Lakes State Park. It offers swimming, boating, fishing, and camping.

References

External links
Logan State Park Montana Fish, Wildlife & Parks

State parks of Montana
Protected areas of Lincoln County, Montana
Protected areas established in 1967